Elkesley is a village in Nottinghamshire, England. According to the 2001 census it had a population of 805, increasing to 822 at the 2011 Census. It is located 6 miles south of Retford.

The parish church of St Giles was built c. 1300 in Decorated style, and was partially reconstructed in 1845. There is also a pub in Elkesley named the  Robin Hood  and also a small shop and a primary school, which in January 2008, 82 pupils attended.

Toponymy
Elkesley seems to contain the Old English personal name, Ealac''',   + lēah'' (Old English) a forest, wood, glade, clearing; (later) a pasture, meadow., so  'Ealac's wood/clearing'.

A1 road
Elkesley is highly unusual in that it is only accessible by a dual carriageway, the A1 road. The residents have been campaigning for a bridge for over twenty years.

The Highways Agency (HA) has acknowledged that access to and from the village is difficult and implemented a temporary speed limit of 50 mph in the 1990s. The HA started a consultation in 2005, with an exhibition held at Elkesley village hall in February 2008. A Public Inquiry was planned for 2010 but postponed pending the outcome of the Spending Review.

In 2013, construction began on a bridge connecting Elkesley to the A1 road. It opened in mid-late 2015.

References

External links

 Elkesley Village Website

Villages in Nottinghamshire
Civil parishes in Nottinghamshire
Bassetlaw District